Ijeoma Esther Okoronkwo (born 27 March 1997) is a Nigerian footballer who plays as a forward for Saint-Étienne and the Nigeria women's national team.

Early life
Okoronkwo was born in Abia State and raised in Richmond, Texas, United States.

College career
Okoronkwo has attended the John and Randolph Foster High School, the Northeast Texas Community College and the Lamar University.

International career
Okoronkwo made her senior debut for Nigeria on 10 June 2021 as a 43rd-minute substitution in a 0–1 friendly loss to Jamaica.

International goals

References

External links 

1997 births
Living people
Sportspeople from Abia State
Nigerian women's footballers
Women's association football forwards
Nigeria women's international footballers
Nigerian emigrants to the United States
Naturalized citizens of the United States
People from Richmond, Texas
Sportspeople from the Houston metropolitan area
Soccer players from Texas
American women's soccer players
College women's soccer players in the United States
Lamar Lady Cardinals soccer players
American sportspeople of Nigerian descent
African-American women's soccer players
21st-century African-American sportspeople
21st-century African-American women